Arshavir is an ancient Armenian name that means "virile" (from the Persian).  According to Johann Heinrich Hübschmann (1848-1908) it means "man" (Zend aršan +vira).

This name is related to the family of the 9th-century Patriarch of Constantinople, Photius. Photius' mother Irene was the sister of Arshavir, who had married Calomaria, the sister of Caesar Bardas and the empress Theodora.

Arshavir, Photius' uncle, is often confused with Arshavir, the brother of John the Grammarian.

People with the name
Arshavir Shirakian (1900–1973), Armenian writer

Notes

See also
 Hayots andznanunneri baṛaran (Dictionary of the Armenian First Names), Yerevan, Vol. 1-5, 1942-1962.

Armenian masculine given names